Robert Bates may refer to:

 Bob Bates (born 1953), American computer game designer
 Bob Bates (musician) (1923–1981), musician in the 1950s Dave Brubeck Quartet
 Robert Bates (political scientist) (born 1942), professor of government at Harvard University
 Robert Bates (mountaineer) (1911–2007), American mountaineer and author
 Robert Bates (loyalist) (1948–1997), Ulster loyalist, member Shankill Butchers gang 
 Robert B. Bates (1789–1841), Speaker of the Vermont House of Representatives
 Robert C. Bates, Tulsa deputy convicted for the shooting of Eric Harris
 Robert Charles Bates (c.1872–?), African-American architect, teacher, and textbook author
 Robert John Bates (born 1946), Australian botanist